Der Kampf (German: The Struggle) was a monthly political magazine published in the period between 1907 and 1938. It was first headquartered in Vienna and then in Prague and Brno. It was affiliated with the Austrian Social Democratic Party, and its subtitle was Sozialdemokratische Monatsschrift (German: Social democratic monthly).

History and profile
Der Kampf was launched by the Austrian social democrats, including Otto Bauer, Adolf Braun and Karl Renner in October 1907. Its major goal was to provide a platform for the discussions about the theoretical issues and those regarding the Austrian workers' movement. It was modeled on Die Neue Zeit which was founded by Karl Kautsky.

The editors included Bauer, Braun and Renner. It was published by Georg Emmerling on a monthly basis in Vienna until February 1934. From 1934 to 1938 Der Kampf was published illegally and was based in Prague and then in Brno.

Content and contributors
In February 1933 it published an exchange between Friedrich Adler and Karl Kautsky about the socialist democracy. Leading contributors included Max Adler, Friedrich Austerlitz, Robert Danneberg, Julius Deutsch, Wilhelm Ellenbogen, Ludo Hartmann, Rudolf Hilferding, Engelbert Pernerstorfer, Pavel Axelrod, August Bebel, and Emile Vandervelde. A short article on terrorism by Leon Trotsky was also featured in Der Kampf. Otto Bauer published a total of 152 articles in the journal which were mostly concerned with the national and international political events and problematic issues in regard to the international workers’ movement and the Social Democratic Party. Bauer used various pseudonyms such as Karl Mann and Heinrich Weber, but he also used his name in these articles.

Der Kampf featured the first article on Fascism entitled "Der Putsch der Fascisten" written by Julius Braunthal in November 1922 shortly after March on Rome which was an organized mass demonstration and a coup d'état by Benito Mussolini's National Fascist Party.

References

1907 establishments in Austria
1938 disestablishments in Austria
Defunct magazines published in Austria
Defunct political magazines
German-language magazines
Magazines established in 1907
Magazines disestablished in 1938
Magazines published in Vienna
Monthly magazines published in Austria
Magazines published in Prague
Mass media in Brno
Socialist magazines
Social Democratic Party of Austria